Watarrka National Park is a protected area  in the Northern Territory of Australia located about 1,316 kilometres (817 miles) south of the territory capital of Darwin and  southwest of Alice Springs.

It contains the much visited Kings Canyon at the western end of the George Gill Range and Kathleen Springs —  to the southeast of Kings Canyon.

Watarrka National Park was established in 1989 and gets its name from the Aboriginal name of the land.

In 1986, the national park was described by the Department of Environment as follows:One of the most spectacular canyons in Central Australia. Kings Canyon contains some 60 rare or relict plant species and a total of 572 different plant species and 80 species of birds. It is a 'living plant museum' and is notable for its stands of cycads & permanent rock pools. There are some well-preserved Aboriginal paintings and engravings in the area...

The national park is categorised as an IUCN Category II protected area. On 25 March 1986, it was listed on the now-defunct Register of the National Estate.

See also 
 Protected areas of the Northern Territory

References

External links
Official webpage
Webpage on the Protected Planet website

National parks of the Northern Territory
Protected areas established in 1989
1989 establishments in Australia
Northern Territory places listed on the defunct Register of the National Estate